This is the list of Armenian churches in Tbilisi, the capital of Georgia, which was the center of the cultural life of Eastern Armenians until the early 20th century.:

See also
 Armenians in Tbilisi

References

Press Releases of the Armenian Diocese in Georgia

Armenian churches in Georgia (country)
Churches in Tbilisi
Oriental Orthodoxy-related lists
Tbilissi
Lists of religious buildings and structures in Georgia (country)